The Putatan district is an administrative district in the Malaysian state of Sabah, part of the West Coast Division which includes the districts of Kota Belud, Kota Kinabalu, Papar, Penampang, Ranau and Tuaran. The capital of the district is in Putatan Town.

All matters in this town are under the district jurisdiction except for matters such as education and security are still under the supervision of the Penampang District.

Etymology 
The district name originated from "putat", a flowering mangrove tree that was once abundant in the area.

History 
On 2 August 2010, the Putatan District Council began to be established as a separate district from Penampang. From 2011, the council was fully granted independent status in all official matters related to the area under its jurisdiction except for security and education matters which are still under the Penampang District jurisdiction.

Demographics 

According to the last census in 2010, the population of the district is estimated to be around 54,733, mainly Bruneian Malay and Bajau people as well with a significant number of Kadazan-Dusun and Chinese.

Gallery

See also 
 Districts of Malaysia

References

Further reading

External links 

  Putatan District Council